Karenga sub-county is a subdivision of Dodoth County in Kaabong District of northern Uganda. 
Kidepo Valley National Park forms the northern half of the sub-county.

References

Kaabong District